James Walter Govan (born 6 May 1966) is a former Scottish cricketer. 

An offspinner, Govan appeared 5 times for Northamptonshire in the County Championship during the 1989 and 1990 seasons. He took his career best innings figures of 6 for 70 playing for Scotland against Ireland in 1992.

1966 births
Living people
Scottish cricketers
Northamptonshire cricketers
Cricketers from Dunfermline